Robert DeLaurentis may refer to:

 Bob DeLaurentis, is an American television producer
 Robert DeLaurentis (aviator), is an aviator and businessman